David Bryan Rundle (born 25 September 1965) is a former South African cricketer who played two One Day Internationals (ODIs) in 1994.

Born in Cape Town, Rundle attended St Stithians College and Stellenbosch University and was chosen in the Nuffield XI South African Schools XI in 1982/83. Rundle made his first-class debut, for Western Province B against Boland in 1984/85.

Rundle played both his ODIs against Australia during the 1993/94 Benson & Hedges World Series in Australia. In his debut ODI at The Gabba in Brisbane, Rundle had bowling figures of 9-0-42-4.

References

Sources
 Partidge, T., Heydenrych, F. & Sichel, P. (ed.) (1987) The 1987 Protea Cricket Annual of South Africa, South African Cricket Union: Cape Town.

External links

1965 births
Living people
South African cricketers
South Africa One Day International cricketers
Western Province cricketers
Cricketers from Cape Town
Alumni of St Stithians College
Stellenbosch University alumni